Adimi (also Romanized as Adīmī and Hādīmi) is a city in and capital of Posht Ab District, in Nimruz County, Sistan and Baluchestan Province, Iran. At the 2006 census, its population was 2,974, in 630 families.

References

Populated places in Nimruz County

Cities in Sistan and Baluchestan Province